USNS Big Horn (T-AO-198) is a  of the United States Navy.

Big Horn, the twelfth ship of the Henry J. Kaiser class, was laid down at Avondale Shipyard, Inc., at New Orleans, Louisiana, on 9 October 1989 and launched on 2 February 1991. She entered non-commissioned U.S. Navy service under the control of the Military Sealift Command with a primarily civilian crew on 21 May 1992. She serves in the United States Atlantic Fleet.

This ship was one of several participating in disaster relief after the  2010 Haiti earthquake. The Big Horn brought relief supplies to Haiti. During Operation Unified Response, Big Horn transferred 618 pallets of cargo and humanitarian assistance/disaster relief supplies and over 2,000,000 gallons of fuel. USNS Big Horn got underway from Naval Station Norfolk the day after the earthquake struck, arrived on scene in Haiti on January 17 and worked until being relieved by USNS Leroy Grumman on 11 February. In 2015, she refuelled RFA Gold Rover in the South Atlantic.

References

External links

 NavSource Online: Service Ship Photo Archive: USNS Leroy Grumman (T-AO-195)
 USNS Big Horn (T-AO 198)

Henry J. Kaiser-class oilers
Ships built in Bridge City, Louisiana
1991 ships